Bojan Prašnikar (born 3 February 1953) is a Slovenian football manager and former player. Prašnikar managed the Slovenian national team three times, between 1991 and 1993, in 1998, and between 2002 and 2004.

Playing career

Prašnikar started his professional football career at his home town club NK Šmartno ob Paki, where he was the top scorer of the Slovenian Republic League in the 1975–76 season. After the season, he moved to Olimpija of Yugoslav First League, spending only one year there before returning to Šmartno, where he played for the next six seasons. During this period he was the league's top scorer on three occasions and won the Slovenian national league title in 1981. In 1983, he transferred to SVG Bleiburg of Austria where he played for one season before retiring.

Coaching career

After retirement, Prašnikar focused on coaching, starting his managerial career at Elkroj, before moving on to coach various other clubs – Celje, Mura, Olimpija, and Rudar Velenje. His most successful spell however, came while in charge of Maribor from 1996 to 2000. Under his guidance, the club won the Slovenian league four times and qualified for the group phase of the UEFA Champions League (the only Slovenian club to ever achieve this), after defeating Genk and Lyon in the qualifying rounds.

Bojan Prašnikar was the manager of the Slovenian national football team during three time spans. After Slovenia's independence in 1991 he was named the first head coach of the national team. He remained in the position until December 1993, when Zdenko Verdenik took charge of the Slovenian affairs until the end of the unsuccessful qualifying campaign for the FIFA World Cup 1998. Prašnikar was re-installed head coach in December 1997, but his second spell at the helm of Slovenia lasted for only four month as in April 1998 he resigned due to his commitments with Maribor on club-level. He was replaced by Srečko Katanec.

His third spell in charge of the Slovenian national team started in July 2002, when the Football Association of Slovenia appointed him the successor of Katanec after the disappointing first round finish of the national team at the FIFA World Cup 2002 and Katanec's swift resignation. This job lasted until May 2004. Not qualified for the 2004 European Football Championship tournament, the Slovenian FA replaced Prašnikar with Branko Oblak, who was the head coach of the Slovenian U21 at that time.

On 28 September 2007, he was appointed by German Bundesliga outfit Energie Cottbus, who had parted company with head coach Petrik Sander five days earlier. Prašnikar, who was in charge of Primorje Ajdovščina in the Slovenian league before that, signed a deal until June 2010 with the former German Cup finalist. On 30 May 2009 Prašnikar announced his leaving at the end of the season from FC Energie Cottbus, his last game was the 2008–09 Bundesliga relegation playoff game on 31 May 2009 against 1. FC Nürnberg which he lost 5–0 on aggregate. On 6 April 2010, Prašnikar signed a contract until the end of the season with the Slovenian team NK Rudar Velenje.

References

1953 births
Living people
People from the Municipality of Šmartno ob Paki
Association football forwards
Yugoslav footballers
Slovenian footballers
NK Šmartno ob Paki players
NK Olimpija Ljubljana (1945–2005) players
SVG Bleiburg players
Yugoslav expatriate footballers
Expatriate footballers in Austria
Yugoslav expatriate sportspeople in Austria
Yugoslav football managers
Slovenian football managers
NK Celje managers
NK Olimpija Ljubljana (1945–2005) managers
NK Rudar Velenje managers
NK Maribor managers
Slovenia national football team managers
AEL Limassol managers
NK Primorje managers
FC Energie Cottbus managers
NK Olimpija Ljubljana (2005) managers
Expatriate football managers in Cyprus
Expatriate football managers in Germany
2. Bundesliga managers
Slovenian expatriate sportspeople in Cyprus
Slovenian expatriate sportspeople in Germany
Slovenian expatriate football managers